Cori Anika Bush (born July 21, 1976) is an American politician, registered nurse, pastor, and Black Lives Matter activist serving as the U.S. representative for . The district includes all of the city of St. Louis and most of northern St. Louis County.

A member of the Democratic Party, on August 4, 2020, Bush defeated 10-term incumbent Lacy Clay in a 2020 U.S. House of Representatives primary election largely viewed as a historic upset, advancing to the November general election in a solidly Democratic congressional district. Bush is the first African-American woman to serve in the U.S. House of Representatives from Missouri. She previously ran in the Democratic primary for the district in 2018 and the 2016 U.S. Senate election in Missouri. She was featured in the 2019 Netflix documentary Knock Down the House, which covered her first primary challenge to Clay. Bush is a member of The Squad in the House of Representatives.

Early life and education 
Bush was born on July 21, 1976, in St. Louis and graduated from Cardinal Ritter College Prep High School in 1994. Her father, Errol Bush, is an alderman in Northwoods, Missouri and previously served as mayor. Bush studied at Harris–Stowe State University for one year (1995–96) and worked at a preschool until 2001. She earned a Diploma in Nursing from the Lutheran School of Nursing in 2008. From 2011 to 2014, she served as a pastor at Kingdom Embassy International Church.

Early career 
In 2011, Bush established the Kingdom Embassy International Church in St. Louis, Missouri. She became a political activist in the 2014 Ferguson unrest, during which she worked as a triage nurse and organizer. She has said she was hit by a police officer. Bush is a Nonviolence 365 Ambassador with the King Center for Nonviolent Social Change.

Bush was a candidate for the 2016 United States Senate election in Missouri. In the Democratic primary, she placed a distant second to Secretary of State Jason Kander. Kander narrowly lost the election to incumbent Republican Roy Blunt.

U.S. House of Representatives

Elections

2018 

Described as an "insurgent" candidate, Bush was endorsed by Brand New Congress and Justice Democrats. Her campaign was featured in the Netflix documentary Knock Down the House, alongside those of Alexandria Ocasio-Cortez, Amy Vilela, and Paula Jean Swearengin. Clay defeated Bush 56.7% to 36.9%.

2020 

In 2020, Bush ran against Clay again. She was endorsed by progressive organizations, including Justice Democrats, Sunrise Movement, and Brand New Congress, and she received personal endorsements from Vermont Senator Bernie Sanders, NY-16 Democratic nominee Jamaal Bowman, former Ohio state Senator Nina Turner, activist Angela Davis, and West Virginia Democratic Senate nominee Paula Jean Swearengin.

Bush narrowly defeated Clay in the primary election in what was widely seen as an upset. Bush received 48.5% of the vote, winning St. Louis City and narrowly losing suburban St. Louis County. Her primary victory was considered tantamount to election in the heavily Democratic district. Her primary win ended the Clay family's 52-year hold on the district. Clay's father, Bill, won the seat in 1968 and was succeeded by his son in 2000. The district and its predecessors have been in Democratic hands for all but 17 months since 1909 and without interruption since 1911. No Republican has received more than 40% in the district since the late 1940s. With a Cook Partisan Voting Index of D+29, it is easily the most Democratic district in Missouri and tied for the 23rd-most Democratic district in the country.

As expected, Bush won the general election handily, defeating Republican Anthony Rogers with 78 percent of the vote.

Tenure 
Soon after being sworn in, Bush joined "The Squad", a group of progressive Democratic lawmakers. She posted a photo on Twitter of herself, the four original Squad members, and another new member, Bowman, with the caption "Squad up."

On January 6, 2021, hours after rioters stormed the U.S. Capitol in a failed bid to overturn Donald Trump's loss to Joe Biden in the 2020 election, Bush introduced a resolution to remove every Republican who supported attempts to overturn the 2020 United States presidential election from the House of Representatives. In her support for Trump's second impeachment, Bush called the attack on the Capitol a "white supremacist insurrection" incited by the "white supremacist-in-chief".

In August 2021, Bush took a leading role in fighting to extend the CARES Act's eviction moratorium, sleeping on the steps of the U.S. Capitol to make her point; the CDC extended the moratorium on August 3.

On August 5, 2021, Bush defended spending tens of thousands of dollars on personal security for herself as a member of Congress while also saying Democrats should defund the police, saying, "I get to be here to do the work, so suck it up—and defunding the police has to happen. We need to defund the police." On November 5, 2021, Bush was one of six House Democrats to break with their party and vote with a majority of Republicans against the Infrastructure Investment and Jobs Act, because it was not accompanied by the Build Back Better Act.

As of July 2022, Bush had voted in line with Joe Biden's stated position 93.0% of the time.

Foreign and defense policy 
Bush was one of four House Democrats to vote against H.R. 567: Trans-Sahara Counterterrorism Partnership Program Act of 2021, which would establish an interagency program to assist countries in North and West Africa to improve immediate and long-term capabilities to counter terrorist threats, and for other purposes.

In September 2021, Bush was among 38 House Democrats to vote against the National Defense Authorization Act of 2022. She was among 51 House Democrats to vote against the final passage of the 2022 National Defense Authorization Act.

On September 23, Bush was one of eight Democrats to vote against the funding of Israel's Iron Dome missile defense system.

In November, Bush was one of 29 House Democrats to vote against the RENACER Act, which extended U.S. sanctions against Nicaragua and granted Biden several ways to address acts of corruption and human rights violations by the Daniel Ortega administration, including the power to exclude Nicaragua from the Dominican Republic-Central America Free Trade Agreement (CAFTA-DR) and to obstruct multilateral loans to the country.

In July 2022, Bush was one of 77 House Democrats to vote for an amendment that would have cut the proposed defense budget by $100 billion. On the same day, she was one of 137 House Democrats to vote for a separate amendment that would have removed a proposed $37 billion spending increase in the defense budget.

Public transportation 
Bush and congressional allies, including Senator Roy Blunt, successfully advocated for the Federal Transit Administration Climate Relief Fund. According to Bush, "that fund was going to have zero dollars in it" to repair damage to public transit systems from severe storms and flooding across the years 2017, 2020, 2021, and 2022. Bush threatened to withhold her vote for the budget if FTA funds were not included.

Committee assignments 
 Committee on the Judiciary
 Subcommittee on the Constitution, Civil Rights and Civil Liberties
 Subcommittee on Crime, Terrorism and Homeland Security
 Committee on Oversight and Government Reform
 Subcommittee on Economic and Consumer Policy
 Subcommittee on Environment

Caucus memberships 
Congressional Progressive Caucus
Congressional LGBTQ+ Equality Caucus
Congressional Black Caucus
Medicare for All Caucus

Political positions 

Bush is a progressive Democrat, supporting policies such as defunding the police, criminal justice and police reform, abortion rights, Medicare for All, a $15 minimum wage, tuition-free state college and trade school, and canceling student debt. She was endorsed by, and is a member of, the Democratic Socialists of America. Bush supports the Boycott, Divestment and Sanctions (BDS) movement and has called Israel an "apartheid state." She stands "unwaveringly with Black Lives Matter's demands".

During her campaign, Bush advocated defunding the United States Armed Forces. After receiving criticism from California Representative Kevin McCarthy and a St. Louis Post-Dispatch editorial, Bush clarified that she supported the reallocation of defense funding to healthcare and low-income communities.

After supporters of then-president Donald Trump stormed the United States Capitol on January 6, 2021, Bush introduced a resolution to investigate and expel members of the House who promoted the conspiracy theory that the 2020 presidential election was stolen from Trump. On January 29, after House Speaker Nancy Pelosi accepted her request, Bush changed offices from the Longworth House Office Building after Congresswoman Marjorie Taylor Greene "berated" her and her staff in a hallway and refused to wear a mask. Greene accused Bush of calling for violence against a couple involved in the controversial July 2020 march through a gated St. Louis street.

Syria 
In 2023, Bush was among 56 Democrats to vote in favor of H.Con.Res. 21, which directed President Joe Biden to remove U.S. troops from Syria within 180 days.

Personal life 
Bush lives in St. Louis, Missouri. She has two children. For 14 months, she and her then husband lived in their car with the young children after being evicted because of loss of income after illness during her second pregnancy made it necessary for her to quit her preschool job. In February 2023, Bush married Cortney Merritts, a security specialist and U.S. Army veteran.

In May 2021, Bush testified to the House Oversight and Reform Committee that during her first pregnancy, she informed her doctor of severe pain but was ignored, and as a result went into pre-term labor. She attributed this to "harsh and racist treatment" that Black women face during pregnancy and childbirth. In a subsequent tweet, she wrote, "Every day, Black birthing people and our babies die because our doctors don't believe our pain."

Electoral history

2016

2018

2020

2022

See also 
 Black women in American politics
 List of African-American United States representatives
 Women in the United States House of Representatives

Explanatory notes

References

External links 

 Representative Cori Bush official U.S. House website
 Campaign website

|-

1976 births
Living people
20th-century African-American people
20th-century African-American women
African-American activists
21st-century African-American politicians
21st-century African-American women
21st-century American politicians
21st-century American women politicians
Activists from St. Louis
African-American members of the United States House of Representatives
African-American nurses
African-American people in Missouri politics
African-American religious leaders
African-American women in politics
American women nurses
Black Lives Matter people
Candidates in the 2016 United States Senate elections
Candidates in the 2018 United States elections
Christians from Missouri
Democratic Party members of the United States House of Representatives from Missouri
Female members of the United States House of Representatives
Harris–Stowe State University alumni
Left-wing populism in the United States
Democratic Socialists of America politicians from Missouri
Missouri socialists
Politicians from St. Louis
Prison reformers
Progressivism in the United States
Protestants from Missouri
Women Christian religious leaders
Women civil rights activists
Women in Missouri politics